The Dali–Lincang railway is a single-track electrified railway in China.

History
In December 2020, electrification of the railway was completed. It opened on 30 December 2020. Initial service provision was three trains in each direction between Dali and Lincang, and one train per day in each direction between Kunming and Lincang. Services will be increased further from 20 January 2021.

Major Passenger stations
Dali

 (opened on November 6, 2021)

References

Railway lines in China
Railway lines opened in 2020
Transport in Dali Bai Autonomous Prefecture
Transport in Lincang